Macrodes is a genus of moths of the family Erebidae. The genus was erected by Achille Guenée in 1854.

Species
Macrodes columbalis Guenée, 1854
Macrodes cynara Cramer, 1775

References

Calpinae